The 1951 Montenegrin Republic League was the sixth season, of the Montenegrin Republic League, that began in March 1951 and ended in June same year.

Season 

On season 1951, in Republic League participated six teams - three, two or one best-placed from three different qualifying group.

Qualifiers 
In the qualifiers participated 14 teams. They were a part of three regional qualifying groups (zones). Two best-placed teams from each group gained promotion to 1951 Montenegrin Republic League. Group 1 
In qualifying group 1 played teams from Northern Montenegro. At the end, Radnički Ivangrad and Bratstvo Bijelo Polje qualified for Republic League.

 Group 2 
In qualifying group 2 played teams from Central Montenegro. At the end, Sutjeska and Lovćen qualified for Republic League. Additionally, as second-placed team from Group 3 withdrew from competition, Iskra as a best third-placed team gained promotion to Republic League. During the qualifiers, Sutjeska defeated Dečić 10-0 and that was the highest win on 1951 season.

 Group 3 
In qualifying group 3 played teams from coastal Montenegro. At the end, Arsenal qualified for Republic League. Second placed Primorac Bijela withdrew after the qualifiers, due to financial and technical difficulties to play in Montenegrin Republic League.

 Championship 
During the sixth edition of Montenegrin Republic League, four teams struggled for the title until the last week of championship - Radnički, Sutjeska, Bratstvo and Lovćen. At the end, after the home victory against Sutjeska (3-2) in the final week of championship, Radnički won the season, with only single point more than teams from positions 2-4. With that success, Radnički for the first time played in qualifiers for Yugoslav Second League.
 Table 

 Results 
Radnički finished season with four defeats. Most goals (10) was seen on the game Radnički - Lovćen (8-2'').

Qualifiers for Yugoslav Second League 
Radnički played in qualifiers for Yugoslav Second League. They played against Second League side Bokelj. After two games, Radnički failed to gain their first-ever promotion to second-tier competition.

Higher leagues 
On season 1951, two Montenegrin teams played in higher leagues of SFR Yugoslavia. Both of them (Budućnost and Bokelj) participated in 1951 Yugoslav Second League.

See also 
 Montenegrin Republic League
 Montenegrin Republic Cup (1947–2006)
 Montenegrin clubs in Yugoslav football competitions (1946–2006)
 Montenegrin Football Championship (1922–1940)

References 

Montenegrin Republic League